George Griffiths (born 9 April 1938) is an Australian cricketer. He played nineteen first-class matches for New South Wales and South Australia between 1962/63 and 1967/68.

See also
 List of New South Wales representative cricketers
 List of South Australian representative cricketers

References

External links
 

1938 births
Living people
Australian cricketers
New South Wales cricketers
South Australia cricketers
Cricketers from Sydney